Paweł Prądziński (born 23 March 1991) is a Polish badminton player. He was a champion at the 2017 Iceland International in the men's doubles event with partner Jan Rudziński.

Achievements

BWF International Challenge/Series 
Men's singles

Men's doubles

  BWF International Challenge tournament
  BWF International Series tournament
  BWF Future Series tournament

References

External links 
 

1991 births
Living people
People from Koszalin
Polish male badminton players